Deir Muqaran is a village in southern Syria, administratively part of the Rif Dimashq Governorate, located northwest of Damascus in Wadi Barada. Nearby localities include Ain al-Fijah, Deir Qanun, al-Dimas, Jdeidat al-Wadi, Kfeir al-Zayt and Basimah. According to the Syria Central Bureau of Statistics, Deir Muqaran had a population of 4,803 in the 2004 census. Its inhabitants are predominantly Sunni Muslims.

References

Bibliography

Populated places in Qudsaya District